Destruction Bay is a small community on the Alaska Highway (historical mile 1083) in Canada's Yukon on Kluane Lake.

Populated mostly by non-aboriginal residents, community residents provide Yukon government services to residents in the area (school, highway maintenance), including nearby Burwash Landing and some tourism-related businesses along the Alaska Highway. The name is derived from the wind blowing down structures erected by the military during highway construction in 1942–43.

The community has a one-room school serving kindergarten through grade eight.

Demographics 

References

External links
Community Profile
"Destruction Bay", The Canadian Encyclopedia
Hotels on Yellow Pages
AccuWeather
 RV Park Reviews

Settlements in Yukon